The Zaragoza Tram is a tram system in the Spanish city of Zaragoza, capital of the autonomous community of Aragon. It has one line called Line 1 and it was expected to be expanded with a second and third line but the project was cancelled and plans to recover it are now being made.

History 

In 1885, the first animal traction tram line was established. 

In 1902, Zaragoza had five main lines and one secondary line. In the same year, one of the lines were electrified. The network was expanding quickly in a radial form across the city, with the present Spain square as the center.

The 1950s was the heydey of the Zaragoza Tram.

From the 1960s, the tram system declined, with little or no investment and was gradually converted to bus operation

On 23 January 1976, the last Zaragoza tram line (Parque-San José) disappeared and the company changed its name to Transportes Urbanos de Zaragoza (Urban Transport Company of Zaragoza).

On 10 June 2009, the Traza consortium of Tuzsa, CAF, FCC Construcción, Acciona, Ibercaja and Concessia selected to build new tramway.

On 19 April 2011, Phase 1 of Line 1 opened. Phase 2 of the work of the new tram line 1 began for completion in mid-2013.

Two more lines are proposed:
 Line 2 (Las Fuentes-Delicias)
 Line 3 (La Jota-Torrero)

Network

Line 1 (Valdespartera-Parque Goya) 

The initial north-south line has 25 stops with side platforms except in two of them. The average distance between consecutive stops is about 500 m, adding a total length of 12.8 km line, operating at an average commercial speed of 19 km/h, with an end-to-end journey time of 40 minutes, 19 minutes for the journey Academia General Militar-Plaza de España (Spain Square) and 21 minutes from Plaza de España to Plaza Cinema Paradiso (Valdespartera).

Construction work started on August 18, 2009 and was projected to last four years in two phases:
 Phase 1 (2009–2011): Section between the Valdespartera neighbourhood and Plaza de Basilio Paraiso. Opened 19 April 2011.
 Phase 2: (2011–2013): Section between the Plaza de Basilio Paraiso and Academia General Militar. 

The estimated investment is 400 million euros:
 Construction of the track and electrical system 202 million
 Purchase of rolling stock: 82 million
 Construction of the depot: 37 million
 Private investment due to works' enhancing "private" facilities: 55 million
 Traffic light system integration and other expenses: 25 million

The expected traffic in the project is around 100,000 passengers per day, with an average rate of 0.75 euros per passenger. In 2018, the line served 27.8 million passengers.

Rolling stock

They have a capacity of 200 people, 54 seated and 146 standing (at 3.5 persons per m2).

Electricity 

The trams mostly use conventional catenary, but in the historical city centre (between Plaza Paraíso and the Roman wall) they use stored braking energy and, additionally, receive power during stops, thanks to the ACR system. Thus no overhead wires are present in the historic area.

Future expansion

A second line is planned, utilising existing Cercanías Zaragoza track for tram train operation to Villanueva de Gállego.

Network Map

References

External links 

 Project web, Zaragoza town hall (in Spanish)
 
 
 

Tram transport in Spain
Zaragoza
Zaragoza